The Treaty of the Lutsk was a secret agreement signed in Lutsk, Poland-Lithuania (now in Ukraine), between the Tsardom of Russia and the Ottoman Protectorate of Moldavia on 13 April 1711, shortly after the outbreak of the Russo-Ottoman War of 1710–11. The Ottoman Protectorate of Kara Bogdan (Moldavia) supported Russia in its war against the Ottomans with troops and by allowing the Russian army to cross its territory and to place garrisons in Moldavian fortresses. The Moldavians were represented by the Metropolitan of Moldavia Ghedeon. The text of the treaty was elaborated entirely by Moldavian Hospodar Dimitrie Cantemir, who broke his oath to the Sultan and promised to become the vassal of the Russian tsar.

Terms 
In the preamble and in Article I, Dimitrie Cantemir worships the tsar, receiving in return protection from Peter I for himself and for all the people of Moldavia. It is provided that the lord of Moldavia "with all the great boyars and her nobles and with the inhabitants of any state of the glorious Moldavian people" should henceforth be under the protection of the tsar and will take an oath of obedience at first in secret, until at the entry of the Russian armies into the principality and then, the voivode will carry his faith secretly "by correspondence and other means".

Article II makes the lord of Moldavia join the army of the Russian army.

Articles III to V provide that the heirs of the Russian throne do not have the right to rule in Moldavia or in the Wallachian land. In Moldavia, the reign is to be hereditary in the Cantemir family.

Article VI provides, "According to the old Moldovan custom, all power should be with the lord". The tsar cannot interfere in the internal affairs of Moldavia.

Article XI provides that the borders of the principality, according to its ancient rights, are those described with the Dniester River, Camenețu, Bender, with all of Budjak, Danube, Muntenia, the Grand Duchy of Transylvania and Poland.

According to Articles XII to  XV, Russian protection over Moldavia is to be maintained after the conclusion of the peace in the sense that Peter is not to leave Moldavia under the domination of the Gate.

Articles XVI and XVII contain the oaths of Peter I and Dimitrie Cantemir.

Links
 Enciclopedia României — Tratatul de la Lutsk

References

History of Moldavia
History of the foreign relations of Romania
Russo-Turkish wars
Lutsk, Treaty of
1711 treaties
1711 in Europe
Lutsk
Treaties of the Great Northern War
Bilateral treaties of Russia